Edi is a 2002 Polish drama film directed and co-written by Piotr Trzaskalski. It received critical acclaim and eleven Polish Film Award nominations, winning two for Best Supporting Actor and Audience Award.

The film was selected as the Polish entry for Best Foreign Language Film at the 75th Academy Awards, but it was not nominated.

Plot 
The film concerns two "scrap pickers" one of whom is falsely accused of seducing a woman and then forced to take of her.

Cast 
 Henryk Gołębiewski – Edi
 Jacek Braciak – Jureczek
 Jacek Lenartowicz – Brat I
 Grzegorz Stelmaszewski – Brat II
 Aleksandra Kisio – Księżniczka
 Dominik Bąk – Cygan
 Małgorzata Flegel-Siedler – Krysia
 Maria Maj – żona Małego
 Tomasz Jarosz – Andrzej
 Stefan Rola – Stefan
 Grażyna Suchocka – sklepowa

Awards and nominations
It was submitted for the List of submissions to the 75th Academy Awards for Best Foreign Language Film, but did not make the cut. However it did win the Polish Academy Audience Award.

References

External links 

2002 films
2000s Polish-language films
2002 drama films
Polish drama films